Songs for a Dying Planet is the tenth solo studio album by the American singer-songwriter and multi-instrumentalist Joe Walsh. It was released in mid 1992, on the label Epic. Keen to re-establish himself after his ill-received 1991 album, Ordinary Average Guy, Walsh enlisted his former producer Bill Szymczyk. At the end of the track "Certain Situations," one can hear a Morse code message that says "Register and vote for me."

The album was received negatively by the majority of music critics and it was also a commercial disappointment, missing the album charts on both sides of the Atlantic, which called an end to Walsh's solo career for 20 years before he released another solo album in 2012 called Analog Man. The song "Vote for Me" however was a minor success, peaking at number 10 on the Hot Mainstream Rock Tracks chart.

Critical reception

Reviewing for AllMusic, critic Vincent Jeffries wrote that the album "fulfills [those] expectations to a degree, but the songwriter's weakened comedic instincts and extreme sincerity make Songs for a Dying Planet a difficult recommendation."

Track listing
All songs written and composed by Joe Walsh except where otherwise indicated.

Personnel 
 Joe Walsh – lead vocals, keyboards, guitars, percussion, trombone
 Joe Vitale – keyboards, drums, percussion, flute, backing vocals
 Dale Peters – bass
 Rick Rosas – bass 
 Jim Brock – percussion
 Jimi Jamison – backing vocals

Production 
 Scott MacLellan – executive producer 
 Bill Szymczyk – producer, engineer, mixing 
 Joe Vitale – co-producer 
 Mark Williams – co-engineer, mixing 
 Mark Herman – assistant engineer 
 Tracey Schroeder – assistant engineer
 Ted Jensen – mastering 
 Dawn Patrol – art direction, design 
 Assheton Gorton – artwork ("Three Men in a Boat")
 David Spero – management 

Studios
 Recorded at Reflection Sound Studios (Charlotte, North Carolina).
 Mixed at Kiva Recording Studio (Memphis, Tennessee).
 Mastered at Sterling Sound (New York City, New York).

Charts
Singles - Billboard (United States)

See also
 List of albums released in 1992
 Joe Walsh's discography

References

Joe Walsh albums
1992 albums
Albums produced by Bill Szymczyk
Albums produced by Joe Walsh
Epic Records albums